David Delfino (born 29 December 1965) is an Italian ice hockey player. He competed in the men's tournaments at the 1992 Winter Olympics and the 1994 Winter Olympics.

References

External links
 

1965 births
Living people
Italian ice hockey goaltenders
Olympic ice hockey players of Italy
Ice hockey players at the 1992 Winter Olympics
Ice hockey players at the 1994 Winter Olympics
Sportspeople from Somerville, Massachusetts
Ice hockey players from Massachusetts
UMass Lowell River Hawks men's ice hockey players
SHC Fassa players
HC Alleghe players
HC Merano players
Kölner Haie players
American people of Italian descent